Paulina Malulu (born 28 April 1989) is a Namibian beauty queen and model who represented Namibia and participated at the Big Four international beauty pageants. She competed in Miss International 2012 and was in the Top 15. She went on to compete for Miss World 2013 and Miss Universe 2013 and Miss Earth 2014.

Born in exile, shortly before independence, Malulu grew up in Windhoek. After completing her high school education, Malulu studied health and skincare and also has a qualification in tour guiding. 

Malulu is also the executive director and founder of the Paulina Malulu Trust (PMT), an operating, not-for-gain organization that advocates for the roles of beauty queens. She also organised the "Day of the Beauty Queen", an annual event that highlights the important social role of beauty queens that was first held in Namibia in 2015. 

She has represented Namibian youth on the African Youth Forum, the Global Aids Summit and serving as Public Relations for the Namibia Book Fair.

References

External links

Official Miss Namibia website

Living people
Miss World 2013 delegates
Miss Universe 2013 contestants
Namibian beauty pageant winners
1989 births
Miss Earth 2014 contestants
Miss International 2012 delegates
People from Windhoek